Relentless is the debut solo album by English singer Jo O'Meara. It was released by Sanctuary Records on 3 October 2005 in the United Kingdom, two and a half years after the initial split of her band S Club 7 in May 2003. Chiefly produced by Brian Rawling and co-written by O'Meara, the album is a mix of contemporary pop, disco and soulful ballads. It debuted and peaked at 48 on the UK Albums Chart.

Critical reception

Caroline Sullivan from The Guardian found that "her solo album confirms beyond debate that [O'Meara] does indeed have a voice, and an Aguilera-type tornado at that, but it also proves that S Club's club-footed balladry still has a pernicious hold. The Celine Dion-ised slurpiness of the opening title track kickstarts a whole album's worth of future hen party classics. To hear her wasting her strong, sure vocals on sub-Kylie generica like "Let's Love" and the Nashville-via-Essex stab at country, "Never Felt Like This," is a pain. The joyous redemption of "Wish I Was Over You" is reminiscent of S Club's one claim to fabness, "Don't Stop Moving, and," similarly, just highlights the tepidness of the rest." BBC Music's James Blake called Relentless "slick, well constructed and safer than a bet on black still being in fashion this time next year [...] However that doesn't detract from this being a fairly decent debut; far better than certain other ex boy and girl band members."

Track listing

Notes
 signifies an additional producer.

Charts

References 

2005 debut albums
Jo O'Meara albums
Albums produced by Brian Rawling
Sanctuary Records albums
Albums produced by Bill Padley
Albums produced by Graham Stack (record producer)
Albums produced by Mark Taylor (music producer)
Albums produced by Eg White